Grand coalition (shortened to:) is a term in German politics describing a governing coalition of the parties Christian Democratic Union (CDU) along with its sister party the Christian Social Union of Bavaria (CSU) and the Social Democratic Party (SPD), since they have historically been the major parties in most state and federal elections since 1949. The meaning of the term may change due to the growth of some formerly minor parties in recent years.

If the coalition also includes the liberal Free Democratic Party (FDP), it is called "Germany coalition", with the party colors matching the flag of Germany: black for CDU/CSU, red for SPD and yellow for FDP.

Weimar Republic (1919–1933)
In the Weimar Republic of 1919 to 1933, the term "grand coalition" was used for a coalition that included the Social Democratic Party, SPD, the Catholic Centre Party and the liberal parties Democratic Party, DDP and People's Party, DVP. Such a coalition was in power in 1923 and from 1928 until 1930, although the latter was a conglomerate of parties with somewhat conflicting interests that banded together as a safeguard for democracy against the radical political parties, the KPD and the NSDAP.
In March 1930, the Great Coalition broke apart, with the resignation of the SPD over the contentious issue of increasing employees' national insurance contributions at a time when wages were falling.

Federal Republic (1949–)

Federal level 
In the post-war politics of Germany, four grand coalitions (Große Koalitionen) have been formed at the federal level through the Bundestag.

Kiesinger cabinet (1966–1969) 
On 1 December 1966, the government was formed by the Social Democratic Party of Germany and the Christian Democratic Union of Germany, the two major political parties in the Federal Republic of Germany. It was the result of arguments about tax increases between the CDU/CSU–FDP coalition of the time. The FDP ministers stood down and a new government was formed with the SPD under Kurt Georg Kiesinger of the CDU. The grand coalition was in control of 90% of the Bundestag (468 of 518 seats), leaving some politically active students disillusioned; this disillusionment led to the formation of the Außerparlamentarische Opposition which formed a core of the German student movement. The Kiesinger grand coalition lasted until 1969.

Merkel cabinets (2005–2009, 2013–2021) 
After the inconclusive result of the 2005 German federal election, neither of the traditional coalitions could form a majority government. A larger centre-left coalition was possible, comprising the SPD, Greens, and the Party of Democratic Socialism (PDS); but the SPD desired to exclude the PDS, the successor party to East Germany's ruling Socialist Unity Party, from government (i.e. a cordon sanitaire). Consequently, the leaders of the SPD and the CDU/CSU agreed to form a grand coalition, with CDU leader Angela Merkel as chancellor and an equal number of cabinet seats for each party. The chancellor was elected on 22 November, and the 1st Merkel Cabinet took office. The grand coalition lasted until the 2009 federal election, when a coalition was agreed between the CDU/CSU and the FDP.

Following the 2013 election, a third grand coalition was formed by the CDU/CSU and the SPD. Again it would have been numerically possible to form a center-left government with the SPD, Greens, and The Left (the successor party to the PDS), but a grand coalition was formed instead. The term GroKo (shortening for Große Koalition) was named 2013 word of the year in Germany. After the 2017 election, the CDU/CSU initially entered talks with the FDP and Greens (a Jamaica coalition); however, negotiations failed, and the CDU/CSU and SPD ultimately agreed to a fourth grand coalition.

State level 
Historically grand coalitions have been quite frequent at state level. Currently, only two of the sixteen states have never been governed by a grand coalition: Hamburg and North Rhine-Westphalia.

As of October 2020, three states are currently governed by grand coalitions:

Mecklenburg-Vorpommern, the Schwesig cabinet supported by SPD and CDU (in office since July 2017).
Niedersachsen, the Weil cabinet supported by SPD and CDU (in office since November 2017).
Saarland, the Hans cabinet supported by CDU and SPD (in office since March 2018).
In Saxony-Anhalt, the Haseloff cabinet (in office since September 2021) is supported by CDU, SPD and FDP, the first "Germany coalition" in the country since December 1959, after the fifth Kaisen cabinet in Bremen was dissolved.

See also
 German governing coalition
 Historic Compromise (Italy)
 Kenya coalition (Grand coalition including the Greens)
 Grand coalition
 Roman/Red (Netherlands/Belgium)

References

Further reading

Centrism in Germany
Christian Democratic Union of Germany
Social Democratic Party of Germany